Hugh Lawson (March 12, 1935 – March 11, 1997), was an American jazz pianist from Detroit who worked with Yusef Lateef for more than 10 years.

Inspired by Bud Powell, Hampton Hawes and Bill Evans, Lawson first gained recognition for his work with Lateef from 1957 onwards. He recorded with Harry "Sweets" Edison (1962), Roy Brooks, and Lateef again on several occasions in the 1960s. In 1972, he performed with "The Piano Choir" (Strata-East), a group with seven pianists including Stanley Cowell and Harold Mabern.  He went on to tour with Charles Mingus in 1975 and 1977 and made recordings with Charlie Rouse (1977), George Adams, and as a leader.

Lawson died of colon cancer in White Plains, NY, March 11, 1997, at the age of 61.

Discography

As leader/co-leader

As sideman
With George Adams
Hand to Hand (Soul Note, 1980) with Dannie Richmond
Gentleman's Agreement (Soul Note, 1983) with Dannie Richmond
Nightingale (Blue Note, 1989)
America (Blue Note, 1990)
With Roy Brooks
The Free Slave (Muse, 1970 [1972])
With Kenny Burrell
God Bless the Child (CTI, 1971)
With Eddie "Lockjaw" Davis and Harry "Sweets" Eddison
Jawbreakers (Riverside, 1962)
With Jimmy Forrest
Sit Down and Relax with Jimmy Forrest (Prestige, 1961)
Most Much! (Prestige, 1961)
Soul Street (New Jazz, 1962)
With Al Grey
Having a Ball (Argo, 1963)
With Yusef Lateef
Jazz for the Thinker (Savoy, 1957)
 Stable Mates (Savoy, 1957)
Jazz Mood (Savoy, 1957)
Before Dawn: The Music of Yusef Lateef (Verve, 1957)
Jazz and the Sounds of Nature (Savoy, 1957)
Prayer to the East (Savoy, 1957)
The Sounds of Yusef (Prestige, 1957)
Other Sounds (Prestige, 1957)
Cry! - Tender (New Jazz, 1959)
The Three Faces of Yusef Lateef (Riverside, 1960)
Jazz 'Round the World (Impulse!, 1963)
A Flat, G Flat and C (Impulse!, 1966)
The Golden Flute (Impulse!, 1966)
The Complete Yusef Lateef (Atlantic, 1967)
The Blue Yusef Lateef (Atlantic, 1968)
Yusef Lateef's Detroit (Atlantic, 1969)
The Diverse Yusef Lateef (Atlantic, 1969)
With Charlie Rouse
Moment's Notice (Storyville, 1977)
With Doug Watkins
Soulnik - (with Yusef Lateef) (New Jazz, 1960)
With Joe Williams
Joe Williams Live! A Swingin' Night at Birdland (Roulette, 1962)

References

1935 births
1997 deaths
American jazz pianists
American male pianists
Cass Technical High School alumni
Black Saint/Soul Note artists
20th-century American pianists
20th-century American male musicians
American male jazz musicians